Neathammer Gulch is a valley in the U.S. state of Oregon.

Neathammer Gulch was named in 1874 after one Daniel E. Neathammer.

References

Landforms of Jackson County, Oregon
Valleys of Oregon